Sidensjö IK is a sports club in Sidensjö, Sweden. The club was established in 1921 and runs soccer, track and field athletics, gymnastics, orienteering and skiing.

The women’s soccer team played five seasons in the Swedish top division between 1978–1986.

References

External links
Soccer 
Orienteering 

1921 establishments in Sweden
Football clubs in Västernorrland County
Athletics clubs in Sweden
Gymnastics clubs
Orienteering clubs in Sweden
Ski clubs in Sweden
Sports clubs established in 1921
Sport in Västernorrland County